John Edward Murphy (May 3, 1869 – April 9, 1941) was a United States Navy sailor and a recipient of America's highest military decoration—the Medal of Honor—for his actions in the Spanish–American War.

Biography
Murphy enlisted in the U.S. Navy from New York and served in the battleship  as a coxswain during the Spanish–American War. Coxswain Murphy was one of eight volunteer crew members of the collier , which Rear Admiral William T. Sampson ordered sunk to block the entrance of Santiago Harbor, Cuba. On the night of June 2/3, 1898, during the attempt to execute this mission, Merrimacs steering gear was disabled by enemy gunfire, and she sank without obstructing navigation. Her crewmen were rescued by the Spanish and made prisoners-of-war. After the Battle of Santiago de Cuba destroyed the Spanish fleet a month later, Murphy and his shipmates were released. For their part in this operation, all eight men were awarded Medals of Honor.

On June 15, 1898, while he was still in Spanish custody, Murphy was promoted to the warrant officer rank of Boatswain. In October 1898, Murphy was assigned to the battleship , which soon went to the Asiatic Station. In the Summer of 1903 he was assigned to the armored cruiser  in the Pacific Squadron. Murphy was promoted to Chief Boatswain on June 15, 1904.

Chief Boatswain John Edward Murphy died at age 71 and was buried at Fort Rosecrans National Cemetery, San Diego, California. His grave can be found in the officer's section, grave 363 GPS (lat/lon): 32.41418, −117.14673.

Medal of Honor citation
Coxswain Murphy's official Medal of Honor citation reads:
In connection with the sinking of the U.S.S. Merrimac at the entrance to the harbor of Santiago de Cuba, 2 June 1898. Despite heavy fire from the Spanish shore batteries, Murphy displayed extraordinary heroism throughout this operation.

See also
 List of Medal of Honor recipients
 List of Medal of Honor recipients for the Spanish–American War

References
 
 
 

1869 births
1941 deaths
19th-century Irish people
Irish sailors in the United States Navy
United States Navy Medal of Honor recipients
Spanish–American War prisoners of war held by Spain
American military personnel of the Spanish–American War
United States Navy officers
Irish-born Medal of Honor recipients
Burials at Fort Rosecrans National Cemetery
Spanish–American War recipients of the Medal of Honor